Professor Roland Chin Tai-hong, BBS, JP (born 1952) is a former President of the Hong Kong Baptist University (HKBU). Before that he was the Provost and Deputy Vice-Chancellor as well as the Chair Professor of Computer Science in the University of Hong Kong (HKU).

Career
After receiving the bachelor and PhD degrees specialising in Electrical Engineering at the University of Missouri, Columbia in 1975 and 1979 respectively, Chin had spent two years in the Goddard Space Flight Center of NASA in Greenbelt, Maryland. He subsequently pursued a teaching career and commenced it at the Department of Electrical and Computer Engineering in the University of Wisconsin–Madison in Madison, Wisconsin where he had stayed for about one and a half decade from 1981 to 1995.

Chin then served in Hong Kong and joined the Hong Kong University of Science and Technology (HKUST) as the Chair Professor of Computer Science at HKUST. With the course of time he started to undertake crucial role in the institution, getting to serve as Vice-President for Research and Development (2003–2006) and then as Deputy President and Provost (Acting: 2006–2007; Permanent: 2007–2010).

In 2010 he was unanimously agreed by the selection committee in the final stage to be appointed Provost and Deputy Vice-Chancellor of the University of Hong Kong.

In May 2015 he accepted the appointment at HKBU and assumed the office later in September that year after his provostship at HKU.

References 

1952 births
Living people
University of Wisconsin–Madison faculty
Academic staff of the University of Hong Kong
University of Missouri alumni
Alumni of St. Paul's Co-educational College